The Archdeacon of Argyll (or Lismore) was the only archdeacon in the diocese of Argyll, acting as a subordinate of the Bishop of Argyll. Regarding his supporting churches, it is known that archdeacon held a quarter of parish church of Eilean Munde as a prebend.

List of archdeacons of Argyll
 Cristin, fl. 1230 x 1236 – 1240
 Gille-Brighde (Gilbertus), fl. 1262–1270
 Muireadhach (Mauricius), fl. 1334
 Labhrann (Laurentius), fl. 1353
 Eoin Mac Dubhghall, x 1361–1387
 Walter de Wardlaw, 1387
 Alexander de Wardlaw, 1387–1388
 Daibhidh Mac Murchaidh, 1388–1391 x 1395
[Opposed by] John Leche, 1388–1391
 Conghan Mac Phaidein, 1391 x 1395–1397
 Niall Caimbeul, 1395–1433 x 1437
 Dubhghall Caimbeul of Lochawe, 1437–1453x1467
[Opposed by] Peter de Dalkeith, c. 1441
 John Lauder, 1441 x 1467–c.1473 
 Peter Sandilands, 1473–1475
 Robert Houston, provided 1475
 John Whitelaw, provided 1475
 William Elphinstone, 1475 x 1478–1480 x 1481 (later Bishop of Ross)
 John Bickertone to receive in exchange, 1479, but never carried through
 John Brown, 1480 x 1483–1483
 Eoin Caimbeul, 1483 x 1486–1487 (later Bishop of the Isles)
 Raibeart Caimbeul, 1487–1490
 Andrew Forman, 1490 (later Bishop of Moray)
 Eoin Arbri, 1490
 David Cunningham, 1489–1509
 Robert Barry, 1509–1526
 Eoin Mac Adhaimh ("John Makcaw"), 1531–1554
 Robert Montgomery, 1554–1601
 Donnchadh Caimbeul, 1601–1603
 James Kirk, 1604–1622
 Adhamh Buidhe	(Adam Boyd), 1622–1629
 Gilleasbaig Mac Lachlainn (Archibald MacLauchlane), 1629–1640

See also
 Bishop of Argyll

Notes

References
 
 

History of Argyll and Bute
Argyll
Christianity in Perth and Kinross
Religion in Argyll and Bute
Religion in Highland (council area)